Marcel de Souza may refer to:
 Marcel Alain de Souza (1953–2019), Beninese banker and politician, president of the Economic Community of West African States (2016–2018)
 Marcel de Souza (basketball) (born 1956), Brazilian professional basketball player and coach